Peter Taua Henry (born 14 August 1990) is a Cook Islands sailor who competed at the 2016 Summer Olympics.

Sailing career
Henry first traveled overseas for an international competition in 2007. He finished 23rd at the 2015 ISAF Sailing World Cup in Melbourne to qualify for the Olympics.

Henry competed for the Cook Islands at the 2016 Summer Olympics in the Laser class.

References

External links

Olympic sailors of the Cook Islands
Cook Island sportsmen
Sailors at the 2016 Summer Olympics – Laser
Cook Island male sailors (sport)
1990 births
Living people